Chad McCumbee (born October 15, 1984) is an American stock car racing driver. He currently drives in the Continental Tire Sports Car Challenge and has run four full seasons in the NASCAR Camping World Truck Series. He is also known for his portrayal of Dale Earnhardt Jr. in 3: The Dale Earnhardt Story.

Early career
McCumbee began his career racing go-karts at the age of ten. He has more than 100 victories in local, regional and national World Karting Association Dirt Series events, all which he accomplished in the five-year span from 1995 to 2000. He was also Allison Legacy Series National and Regional championship along with Rookie of the Year in his very first full season in the series in 2001. He also won the 2002 national title becoming the first and so far only two-time champion of the series. In 2003, he started late model racing at Myrtle Beach Speedway, and became the youngest rookie winner at the track.

McCumbee made his ARCA RE/MAX Series in 2004 at Michigan International Speedway for Hillenburg, but flipped the #10 Fast Track Driving School Chevy in spectacular fashion after 21 laps and finished 37th. He finished fourth in the point standings in 2005, his first full year of competition, continuing to drive for Hillenburg, winning one pole and gathering ten top-ten finishes.

NASCAR
McCumbee moved to the NASCAR Craftsman Truck Series in 2006, initially as driver of the No. 06 Chevrolet Silverado for MRD Motorsports. After failing to qualify for the season opening event at Daytona International Speedway, he had two consecutive top-fifteen finishes before MRD closed, moving him to the No. 08 Green Light Racing Chevy owned by Bobby Dotter. He finished 9th in his first race with the team at Texas Motor Speedway, and split time in the next five races between Green Light's No. 07 and No. 08 entries with occasional sponsorship from U.S. Restoration, before moving to the No. 08 permanently with Garmin/The GPS Store as sponsor. He had two seventh-place finishes through the year and finished seventeenth in season points. During the season, he briefly was a member of Chevrolet's driver development program, but his contract was not renewed at the end of the season.

McCumbee drove first 15 Craftsman Truck Series races in the 2007 season for Green Light Racing. his best finish with Green Light was 13th twice at Daytona and Dover. On 14 August he left Green Light Racing, and on the 20th announced he would drive for MRD Motorsports replacing Blake Bjorklund with The GPS Store and Garmin coming with him to sponsor the No. 8. With The No. 8 team, he scored his first top ten of the year at Las Vegas. McCumbee took the truck to a near upset victory at Texas before spinning his tires on a restart which led to being wrecked while leading with two laps to go and he finished 13th. On 2 May 2007, Petty Enterprises announced McCumbee would make his NEXTEL Cup debut, filling in for Kyle Petty while he was in the TNT broadcast booth, for one race at Pocono on 10 June 2007 in the Pocono 500. Goody's Cool Orange Headache Powders sponsored the car, and McCumbee finished 25th in that race.  Petty tabbed him again for Michigan in the 3M Performance 400 because of Petty's broken hand. Clutch problems after a spin and forced the team behind the wall for more than fifty laps resulting in a 41st-place finish. He also won his first two ARCA races, at Nashville Superspeedway and Pocono Raceway respectively, driving for Andy Belmont.

McCumbee started the 2008 season with a 7th at Daytona, and had a then career-best finish of 5th at Atlanta, before picking up his career best finish of 2nd place at Charlotte in the Malcomson Construction truck. He ended the season 11th in the points standings. He also continued to run part-time for Petty's No. 45 entry with Marathon American Spirit Motor Oil sponsoring, making a total of six starts but failing to qualify on three occasions. His best finish was 17th at Pocono. He was the top choice for Kyle Petty's replacement in the 45, and signed a contract to drive for Petty full-time in 2009. A deal was made to merge Gillett Evernham Motorsports and Petty Enterprises which formed Richard Petty Motorsports, and as a result, McCumbee lost his Sprint Cup ride.

For the 2009 Camping World Truck Series Season, McCumbee rejoined SS-Green Light Racing to be driver of the No. 7 Chevy  with sponsorship from ASI Limited and The GPS Store. He had two top-ten finishes early in the season, and despite funding from Tiwi and Valvoline, he was replaced for four races during the season by other drivers bringing funding, and fell to nineteenth in points. He reunited with Hillenburg to drive the No. 49 Fast Track Racing truck for two races in 2010. In April 2010, McCumbee made his NASCAR Nationwide Series debut at Texas Motor Speedway. Driving the No. 09 Ford for RAB Racing, he finished 31st after starting 20th. Also in April, it was announced that McCumbee had signed with Andy Belmont to run the remainder of the 2010 ARCA Remax Series season in the No.1 Ford.

McCumbee then moved to sports cars, driving in the Continental Tire SportsCar Challenge for C.J. Wilson. He won the 2015 championship in the ST division with co-driver Stevan McAleer.

Motorsports career results

NASCAR
(key) (Bold – Pole position awarded by qualifying time. Italics – Pole position earned by points standings or practice time. * – Most laps led.)

Sprint Cup Series

Nationwide Series

Camping World Truck Series

ARCA Racing Series
(key) (Bold – Pole position awarded by qualifying time. Italics – Pole position earned by points standings or practice time. * – Most laps led.)

Complete British GT Championship results
(key) (Races in bold indicate pole position) (Races in italics indicate fastest lap)

References

External links
 
 
 

Living people
1984 births
People from Brunswick County, North Carolina
Racing drivers from North Carolina
NASCAR drivers
ARCA Menards Series drivers
CARS Tour drivers
Male actors from North Carolina
21st-century American male actors
American male film actors
British GT Championship drivers
Multimatic Motorsports drivers
Michelin Pilot Challenge drivers